Jojo Macari is an English actor and musician, from London.

Early life
Macari would work in his father’s guitar shop in Soho, London. His first theatre experience was in the Jermyn Street Theatre production of A Level Playing Field. He dropped out of his A-levels in order to perform that role but was offered a deferred place to study actor musicianship at Rose Bruford College in Sidcup. He took a role in musical Desperate Measures, an adaptation of Shakespeare’s Measure to Measure.

Career
Macari had his first major acting role in BBC One series Hard Sun. He joined the cast of Netflix miniseries Sex Education in series two and three as Kyle. He appeared as Prince Henry in the third season of 
Harlots. He appeared as Mogwan in two episodes of the Netflix fantasy drama Cursed. He played Billy on the Netflix show 
The Irregulars. Production on The Irregulars was interrupted by the Covid-19 pandemic, during filming Macari accidentally punched fellow actor Alex Ferns in the face, but Macari described Ferns, despite the sternness of some of his roles, "actually a lovely dude".

Macari has an upcoming role in AppleTV+ series Masters of the Air. In 2023 he was cast in Roland Emmerich Gladiator epic 
Those About To Die.

Music
Macari played in the pop-rock band 
Koates and the hardcore-punk band the Rats.
Macari released the album Space and Time and Halloween and Paracetamol in 2021. In 2022, he appeared in the music video for the Sea Girls song Lonely. He also appeared in the video for Female Lead from the band Honeyglaze in 2022.

Filmography

References

External links

Male actors from London
Musicians from London
Living people
Date of birth unknown
English television actors